is a Japanese politician of the Liberal Democratic Party, a member of the House of Representatives in the Diet (national legislature).

Overviews 
A native of Osaka, Osaka and graduate of the University of Tokyo, he joined the Ministry of Construction in 1976. Leaving the ministry in 1999, he was elected to the House of Representatives for the first time in 2000.

References

External links 
 Official website in Japanese.

Members of the House of Representatives (Japan)
University of Tokyo alumni
People from Osaka
People from Kōchi Prefecture
1953 births
Living people
Liberal Democratic Party (Japan) politicians
21st-century Japanese politicians